Gerald Henry Fitzmaurice  (15 July 1865 – 23 March 1939) was a British diplomat.

Born in Dublin, Fitzmaurice was descended from a minor branch of the Petty-Fitzmaurice family. In 1888, he joined the Levant Consular Service. In December 1902 he was appointed to serve on the Joint Commission for the demarcation of the border between the British-ruled Aden Settlement and interior tribes loyal to the Ottoman Empire.  In 1905 he was appointed British consul to Constantinople. In 1907 he was made chief dragoman, and in 1908 he received the rank of first secretary. He retired from the consular service in 1921.

Fitzmaurice was a Roman Catholic and was buried in a simple grave at St. Mary's Roman Catholic Church, Kensal Green in London.

References 

1865 births
1939 deaths
Companions of the Order of the Bath
Companions of the Order of St Michael and St George
British diplomats
Dragomans
Gerald
British Roman Catholics